Abrothallus doliiformis is a species of lichenicolous fungus in the family Abrothallaceae. Found in Peru, it was formally described as a new species in 2015 by Ave Suija and Sergio Pérez-Ortega. It is only known to occur at the type locality. The species epithet doliiformis refers to its doliiform (barrel-shaped) . This feature, along with its hyaline, single-celled conidia (measuring 9.5–14.5 by 6–9.5 μm) distinguish it from other Abrothallus fungi.

References

doliiformis
Lichenicolous fungi
Fungi described in 2015
Fungi of South America
Taxa named by Ave Suija